Josip Petrov Babich (23 October 1895 – 22 August 1983) was a New Zealand gum-digger, winemaker and farmer. He was born in Runović, Dalmatia, Cisleithania, Austria-Hungary, on 23 October 1895.

He was a keen gardener, beekeeper, and photographer.

References

1895 births
1983 deaths
New Zealand farmers
New Zealand winemakers
People from Split-Dalmatia County
Croatian emigrants to New Zealand
New Zealand people of Croatian descent
New Zealand gum-diggers